Faucicola is a genus of bacteria which belongs to the class Gammaproteobacteria with one known species (Faucicola mancuniensis). Faucicola mancuniensis has been isolated from a human oropharynx.

References

Monotypic bacteria genera
Moraxellaceae
Bacteria genera
Taxa described in 2015